Bargh Kerman Volleyball Club was an Iranian professional volleyball team based in Kerman, Iran. On 2011, Bargh was officially dissolved.

Iranian volleyball clubs
2011 disestablishments in Iran
Volleyball clubs disestablished in 2011
Kerman